The Ricoh 5A22 is an 8/16-bit microprocessor produced by Ricoh  for the Super Nintendo Entertainment System (SNES) video game console. It is based on the 8/16-bit WDC 65C816, which was developed between 1982 and 1984 for the Apple IIGS personal computer. It has 92 instructions, an 8-bit data bus, a 16-bit accumulator, and a 24-bit address bus. The CPU runs between 1.79 MHz and 3.58 MHz, and uses an extended MOS Technology 6502 instruction set.

Major features
In addition to the 65C816 CPU core, the 5A22 contains support hardware, including:
 Controller port interface circuits, including serial access to controller data
 An 8-bit parallel I/O port, which is mostly unused in the SNES
 Circuitry for generating non-maskable interrupts on V-blank
 Circuitry for generating interrupts on calculated screen positions
 A DMA unit, supporting two primary modes:
 General DMA, for block transfers at a rate of 2.68 MB/s
 H-blank DMA, for transferring small data sets at the end of each scanline outside of the active display period
 Multiplication and division registers
 Two separate address busses driving the 8-bit data bus: a 24-bit "Bus A" for general access, and an 8-bit "Bus B" mainly for APU and PPU registers

Performance
The CPU as a whole employs a variable-speed system bus, with bus access times determined by the memory location accessed. The bus runs at 3.58 MHz for non-access cycles and when accessing Bus B and most internal registers, and either 2.68 or 3.58 MHz when accessing Bus A. It runs at 1.79 MHz only when accessing the controller port serial-access registers. It works at approximately 1.5 MIPS, and has a theoretical peak performance of 1.79 million 16-bit operations per second.

See also
 Super Nintendo Entertainment System technical specifications
Nintendo SA-1, a co-processor for the SNES based on the same 65C816 CPU core

References

Super Nintendo Entertainment System
Nintendo chips
65xx microprocessors
Ricoh products